Stockholm Central Station is a railway station in Stockholm, Sweden. It is situated in the district of Norrmalm at Vasagatan/Central Plan. The station opened on 18 July 1871 and it had over 200,000 visitors daily, of which about 170,000 were travellers (105,000 with commuter trains, 25,000 with Arlanda Express and 40,000 with other trains), until 10 July 2017 when the local commuter trains started to call at the Stockholm City Station which is located under the central station.

In front of the central station stands a statue of Nils Ericson.

History

The station was built between 1867 and 1871 with Adolf W. Edelsvärd as the architect.  Until 1925 the tracks led into the station but during a renovation 1925-1927 the tracks were moved to the west and the former track hall was converted into a 119 meter long, 28 meter wide and 13 meter high waiting hall.  During the renovation the station was extended to the south through the construction of the southern pavilion.  This part of the station currently houses a conference facility.  Next to the conference facility is the Royal waiting hall where the Royal Family waits when travelling by train.

In 1951 the facade towards Vasagatan was changed and given a more simplified look. In 1958 an underground passage to T-Centralen was opened. In 2017 the commuter trains moved to a separate station, Stockholm City Station, one kilometer away.

In 2011 Jernhusen, a real estate company in Stockholm, found a way to channel the body heat from the hordes of commuters passing through Stockholm's Central Station to warm another building that is just across the road.

Traffic

The station consists of two parts:
 The northern part, with tracks 1 to 7 facing north, forms a terminal station for the Ostkustbanan, Mälarbanan and Arlandabanan railways. Tracks 1 and 2 are reserved for the Arlanda Express, which have platforms level with the train floor allowing step free access. Track 3 is mostly used by Uppsalapendeln and tracks 4 to 7 are used for long-distance and regional traffic and overnight traffic to the north.
 Tracks 10 to 19 in the western part constitute a passing station for Västra stambanan and local commuter trains. Tracks 10 to 12 are mostly used for long-distance and regional trains to the south, but can also be used for traffic to the north, while tracks 17 to 19 are mostly used for long-distance and regional trains to the north, but can also be used for traffic to the south. Most of the trains turn back after the Stockholm Central Station, but some trains continue towards the north. The tracks 13-16 were high-floor tracks used for SL commuter trains until July 2017, now used for regional and long distance trains.

On level with the Northern Railway Square are service depots for long-distance and regional trains. Terminating trains from the south arrive on tracks 17 to 19 where passengers alight, and then continue to the service depots to the north where they are cleaned and have their supplies refilled. Then they return south via tracks 10 to 12. Long-distance trains from tracks 4 to 8 are services in the same way near the Northern Railway Square.

Commuter train station

The Stockholm Central station was the busiest station on the Stockholm commuter rail, with about 53,000 boarding the trains and about as many disembarking every weekday (as of 2005). The commuter rail used two island platforms, one for tracks 13 and 14 (southbound trains) and one for tracks 15 and 16 (northbound trains). Each platform has entries with entry gates from the lower level and a ticket sales office on the upper level with an entry from Klarabergsviadukten. From 2017 the commuter trains moved to a separate underground station, known as Stockholm City Station.

The commuter trains go on their own tracks along Ostkustbanan via Tomteboda, and after Karlberg Station they go underneath the other tracks to avoid conflict with long-distance and regional trains. After the centre, they join the Stockholm connection railway to the south, which has had two tracks since 1871. In 2006, a decision was finally made to construct Citybanan, a new track in a tunnel, and Stockholm City Station, a new station for commuter trains below T-Centralen. The construction was started in January 2009 and was completed in 2017.

Bus
A bus terminal called Cityterminalen is located adjacent to the main station, directly connected by a short pedestrian tunnel.

Local services offered by SL stop at various bus stops close to
the main station's exits.

Metro station
Services on all lines of the Stockholm Metro network are provided on a separate station named T-Centralen. An underground pedestrian passage connects it to Stockholm Central Station.

Services

Arlanda Express
Stockholm-Arlanda Airport
SJ
Intercity services
Falun via Uppsala, Avesta Krylbo, Borlänge
Karlstad via Katrineholm, Hallsberg
Gothenburg via Södertälje Syd, Katrineholm, Hallsberg, Skövde, Herrljunga
Mora via Uppsala, Avesta Krylbo, Borlänge
Östersund via Uppsala, Gävle, Bräcke
Sundsvall via Uppsala, Gävle
Malmö via Norrköping, Nässjö, Lund
Night train
Luleå via Uppsala, Gävle, Sundsvall, Umeå
Narvik via Umeå, Boden, Gällivare, Kiruna
Storlien via Uppsala, Gävle, Sundsvall, Östersund, Åre
Malmö via Norrköping, Nässjö, Alvesta
Hamburg via Norrköping, Linköping, Nässjö, Alvesta, Lund, Malmö (begins 1 September 2022)
SJ commuter rail services
Arboga via Södertälje Syd, Strängnäs, Eskilstuna
Hallsberg via Södertälje, Katrineholm
Linköping via Södertälje, Nyköping, Kolmården, Norrköping
Gävle via Uppsala, some service continues to Ljusdal
Gothenburg via Västerås, Örebro, Hallsberg, Skövde, Herrljunga, Alingsås
Uppsala 
Västerås via Enköping, 
Hallsberg via Enköping, Västerås, Arboga, Örebro
X 2000, also called "SJ Snabbtåg" since 11 December 2011, Express Intercity services
Åre via Uppsala, Sundsvall, Östersund (seasonal during ski season in Åre)
Arvika via Hallsberg, Karlstad
Borås via Skövde, Herrljunga
Malmö via Norrköping, Nässjö, Lund
Copenhagen via Norrköping, Nässjö, Lund, Malmö
Gothenburg via Katrineholm, Skövde
Oslo via Karlstad, Arvika
Nässjö via Norrköping
Sundsvall via Uppsala, Gävle
Uddevalla via Skövde, Herrljunga 
Strömstad via Skövde, Herrljunga, Uddevalla (during summer holidays)
Veolia Transport 
Night train
Åre (Seasonal)
Berlin via Copenhagen, Hamburg (Seasonal)
Flygbussarna (bus departing from Cityterminalen)
Arlanda Airport (ARN)
Bromma Airport (BMA)
Skavsta Airport (NYO)
Västerås Airport (VST)

References

External links 

Tågtider för Stockholm C
Trafikverket
SJ
Jernhusen
Flygbussarana

Railway stations in Stockholm
Railway stations opened in 1871
1871 establishments in Sweden